Koenigia campanulata is a species of flowering plant in the family Polygonaceae. It is native to China (Guizhou, west Hubei, Sichuan, Yunnan and Tibet), Bhutan, north Myanmar, Nepal and Sikkim. It has been introduced into south Chile, Great Britain and Ireland.

References

External links
Bellflower Knotweed in Flowers of India – images

Polygonoideae
Flora of South-Central China
Flora of Tibet
Flora of Bhutan
Flora of Myanmar
Flora of Nepal
Plants described in 1886